Mallodrya is a genus of synchroa bark beetles in the family Synchroidae. There is one described species in Mallodrya, M. subaenea.

References

Further reading

 

Tenebrionoidea
Articles created by Qbugbot